Jack Reilly may refer to:
Jack Reilly (artist) (born 1950), American artist
Jack Reilly (footballer) (born 1943), Australian football (soccer) player
Jack Reilly (American football) (born 1946), American football player
Jack Reilly (musician) (1932–2018), American pianist

See also
Jack Rieley (1942–2015), American record producer
Jack Riley (disambiguation)
John Reilly (disambiguation)